Nadia Pfister (born 18 September 1995 in Basel) is a Swiss professional squash player. As of February 2018, she was ranked number 96 in the world and the best female Swiss player on the world tour of this year. She has represented Switzerland internationally, for example at the European Squash Team Championships.

References

1995 births
Living people
Swiss female squash players
Sportspeople from Basel-Stadt
20th-century Swiss women
21st-century Swiss women
Competitors at the 2022 World Games